Cham Charud (also Romanized as Cham Charūd; also known as Chamcharū) is a village in Bijnavand Rural District, in the Zagros District of Chardavol County, Ilam Province, Iran. At the 2006 census, its population was 184, in 44 families. The village is dominated by Kurds.

References 

Populated places in Chardavol County
Kurdish settlements in Ilam Province